The Cook Strait ferry may refer to any of several ferries across the Cook Strait in New Zealand:
Interislander
StraitNZ